Skunk Fu! is an animated television series featuring the fables of anthropomorphic animals protecting their valley using martial arts. The show chronicles the adventures of young Skunk, training with his Kung Fu master, Panda, with the support of Rabbit, Fox, Turtle, and others, who directly, or inadvertently, also help Skunk grow. The show won the IFTA award for "Best Animation". In addition to an English soundtrack, Irish-language, French-language, Japanese-language, and Dutch-language soundtracks were initially produced.

Synopsis
Skunk and the other valley animals led by Panda thwart Dragon's efforts to overtake their valley with Baboon and the Ninja Monkeys from their lair in the Mountains. Historically Dragon and Panda were friends, but since Dragon was punished by Heaven for his arrogance, he perceives the valley residents as the reason for his downfall (displacing the responsibility of his own actions) and seeks to destroy them. Panda sees Skunk as crucial to saving the valley and endeavors to teach Skunk who often tries to circumvent laborious Kung Fu training, only to learn the value of the initial lesson from the consequences of his actions with Skunk ultimately saving the day, usually by himself or with the help of his friends.

Characters

 Skunk (voiced by Jules de Jongh) – The main character of the series. Skunk is the youngest of the Valley dwellers and wants to be a Kung Fu master, but he has to learn his Kung Fu moves with Panda first. Skunk can sometimes be lazy and impatient. However, when he puts his mind to it Skunk can accomplish a lot going through a lot to achieve the goal he is set. Skunk is very trusting of his friends, even Rabbit who doesn't always treat Skunk with respect. Rather than concentrating on his lessons, Skunk tries to find the "easy way out". However, this usually backfires, forcing Skunk to figure a way out and learn the lesson he was initially trying to avoid. Despite being lazy and sometimes mischievous, Skunk cares about his friends and usually tries to do the right thing. He also has a unique defense mechanism in which he sprays a green and smelly gas, unlike an actual skunk which sprays a stinky amber-colored liquid. This usually happens when he is embarrassed, scared, or suddenly surprised, which causes Skunk great embarrassment. He has also stated that he's incapable of doing it at will unlike real skunks; though this is contradicted in later episodes, such as when he purposely sprays a monkey (pretending to be a skunk) in the face, believing that a fellow skunk would be immune to the stench of his spray. Sometimes, Skunk goes on missions that don't need him, which causes disaster. He usually calls himself "Princess Prettyhead herself" when he is bigger than his enemies or when on a large contraption. He was given to Panda by Heaven when Panda asked for help against Dragon, hinting he has a larger destiny than he's aware of. He also seems to be the only one aware of Rabbit's crush on Fox.
 Rabbit (voiced by Paul Tylak) – A violent, ill-tempered, egotistical, smart-aleck hare (despite his name) who is always on the lookout for conflict. He has a major crush on Fox but will go great lengths to hide this. Sometimes Rabbit has dreams of her. He calls his fist Mr. Fisty and he considers himself the strongest animal in the Valley. He sometimes fights with Panda about it. He also desires to become the leader so he can fight Dragon right away instead of waiting like Panda orders. He creates plans to attack the ninja monkeys, but they always backfire. He has a soft spot for Skunk, calling him "squirt". He also enjoys picking on Skunk and often takes advantage of him, but he cares and loves him as a friend. He even taught Skunk the art of attitude, which Panda said was an art Skunk was not ready for.
 Dragon (voiced by Rod Goodall) – The main antagonist of the series. Many years ago, Heaven made Dragon a Guardian Animal to protect the animals of the Valley. In order to keep his natural Fire in balance, Heaven gave Dragon the power over Water. Back then, Dragon was kind-hearted and was a great friend of Panda's. To test Dragon's loyalty, Heaven sent a drought to the Valley. Dragon asked Heaven if he could use his power over Water to end the drought, but Heaven remained silent. Despite Panda's warnings, Dragon (believing there could be no harm in using his powers to help) went ahead and used his Water powers anyway. As punishment for his impulsive actions and apparent disobedience (both referred to in the opening as his "arrogance"), Heaven stripped Dragon of his ability to fly and made his once beautiful golden scales turn dark and blackened. Horrified by his punishment, Dragon swore revenge. Flying into a great rage, he chased the animals from their mountaintop homes with his Fire. During his rampage, however, Dragon burnt the mysterious Lotus Flower, a blossom that somehow connected Heaven and Earth. With this act, Dragon lost his powers over Water, the only thing that was keeping his Fire in check. As a result, Dragon was severely burned and had to retreat into the freezing waters of a subterranean lake in Lung Mountain to soothe his burns. Now he must constantly be immersed in water, or his Fire will reach unbearable levels. Twisted and embittered by pain and seemingly doomed to stay forever in the icy lake, Dragon plans his revenge against those he holds responsible for his predicament. Dragon blames the animals of the Valley for his fate and devotes much of his energies to destroying them, dispatching his second-in-command, Baboon to carry out his plans. Despite his hatred for all of the animals, Dragon seems to respect Panda for his intelligence and abilities and possibly still for the friendship they once had. In addition to his Fire, he has knowledge of many powerful spells.
 Panda (voiced by Paul Tylak) – Panda is the very wise 80-year-old leader of the Valley who spends his time training Skunk in the various arts. He was Dragon's best friend before Dragon was punished by Heaven and became evil. When he asked Heaven for help, Skunk came down and the Panda raised Skunk in the way of Kung Fu. He and Dragon still respect each other despite Dragon having turned evil. He knows Skunk is the one who is destined to defeat Dragon and free the Valley from his evil and must ensure he is ready when that day comes.
 Baboon (voiced by Paul McLoone) – The secondary villain of the entire series, Baboon is also the head of Dragon's Ninja Monkey army and is also the one usually dispatched to carry out most of Dragon's own plots. Baboon is very dominant over the Ninja Monkeys and often mistreats them to the point of physical abuse. Baboon has even used some of the Ninja Monkeys as punching bags or guinea pigs. However, despite mistreating the Ninja Monkeys, Baboon sometimes expresses concern for them, implying that he cares for their well-being at times although this is very rarely shown. Baboon is mostly something of a lackey to Dragon with Baboon harboring both a strong sense of loyalty and fear to Dragon. Baboon is also an easily angered and very intimidating figure who is in love with Fox, but she does not feel the same way, although she is in fact more than willing to use Baboon's crush against him. He speaks in a Cockney accent. Although he attempts to beat Skunk, Baboon's own stupidity and that of the Ninja Monkeys often results in both sides being regularly defeated with Baboon regularly incurring Dragon's wrath which often sees Baboon getting burnt by Dragon's flames. Despite that, Baboon can hold his own in battle and has proven that he is a dangerous enemy to the Valley. His catchphrase is "Wasabi!" which he usually says mere seconds before he's defeated in battle.
 Ninja Monkeys (voiced by Tony Acworth) – Dragon's soldiers, who are usually dim-witted and ineffectual. There is a potion that can make Ninja Monkeys become invisible, but only someone with the No-Mind skill can see them. Panda says the Ninja Monkeys are funny to watch, which is often true. Ninja Monkeys, though well-trained, are easily defeated. What they make up for lack of skill, they make up for with numbers and a large group of them could even take down Panda. Even though they are usually shorter than most of the Valley dwellers, they were shown to be the same height as Fox in "The Art of Hospitality". Baboon commands the Ninja Monkeys and can even understand what they're saying with Baboon even acting as a translator as well.
 Fox (voiced by Patricia Rodriguez) – An effective, graceful fighter, Fox is the leading lady of the story and the only dog family member in the Valley resistance. Like an older sister to Skunk, she helps him with her sound advice and is very level-headed. She loves Skunk like a little brother and is often protective of him, like getting mad at Rabbit and repeatedly smacking him behind the forehead when he made fun of the young skunk while he was playing with ants in "The Art of Small Victories". Beneath her demure exterior, she has a hot temper and a warrior's spirit which drive Rabbit wild. Although it's unclear whether Fox is annoyed or flattered by Rabbit's affections, she is attracted to Rabbit, although she does consider him too much of a pest. Like Rabbit, she also gives Skunk pet names like "squirt", "little man", or simply "kid". She often uses her allure to escape enemies (especially Baboon). She also mastered the art of Fan-Fan and did the four winds attack with Crane, Duck, and Skunk.
 Pig (voiced by Tony Acworth) – Despite his name, Pig is in fact a wild boar. Pig is simple-minded and spends all of his time bathing in mud. While he rarely helps in battle, he assists against Dragon in other ways, such as eating all of the truffles during the Year of the Pig so that Dragon can't use them for a lotion to temporarily break free from his icy prison for, according to Panda, two or three weeks. While Pig is mostly likable, he is easily influenced by Rabbit to mirror his thoughts. However, he is shown to be a great warrior such as when he was convinced he was a Ninja Monkey. He was easily able to defeat Skunk, Rabbit, and Mantis at the same time. Pig wishes to be treated like a grown pig. 
 Ox and Bird (voiced by Tony Acworth) – Bird is the brains of the duo. They both like nothing better than to relax and accept the fact that they are "nobodies". Ox once was considered a huge hero since he could perform the art of "No Mind" allowing him to see invisible Ninja Monkeys. Ox can understand and speak Ninja Monkey while Bird often considers himself to be great.
 Dr. Turtle (voiced by Tony Acworth) – A wise old Kung Fu master. Turtle is the physician of the Valley and helps to teach Skunk. Dr. Turtle is always happy to help Panda and Tiger. He also is a talented kite-flier and performs a kite display every New Year.
 Ms. Duck (voiced by Jules de Jongh) – A wise old bird with a few moves up her feathers. Like Panda, she knows the back story of Dragon. She also is gifted at making food and Dim sum Fu. She seems to have a horrible singing voice. Duck, Fox, and Crane taught Skunk how fans can be used in battle.
 Tiger (voiced by Rod Goodall) – An old friend of Panda's. Tiger claims to be a great warrior and once fought Dragon. Since that apparently disastrous battle, he has been a tremendous coward, though he fights ferociously if he is angered. He appears to be a White South China tiger.
 Frog (voiced by Tony Acworth) – The master of jumping. Frog appears to be a silly character who likes making people laugh. In "The Art of Giggling", he even helps Skunk conquer a case of the giggles by forcing the young warrior to play leapfrog every time he chuckled.
 Snake (voiced by Paul Tylak) – Snake enjoys inflicting pain (especially on ninja monkeys). He is the Valley spy. Although Snake speaks in an Australian accent, cobras are not indigenous to that continent though he could be another species of snake.
 Killer Bees (voiced by Tony Acworth) – A full nest of bees who tend to be extremely short-tempered and will attack anyone regardless of whether they are friend or foe. They talk in a "hip-hop" style of dialog. Working together, they can form into different shapes such as nunchucks.
 Crane (voiced by Jules de Jongh) – The general town gossip. Crane is often used for aerial missions and was part of the Fan-Fan Quartet with Fox, Duck, and the newly anointed Skunk.
 Mantis (voiced by Tony Acworth) – The valley's lookout bug. When he speaks, he makes brief pauses every few words (a nod to actor Christopher Walken). He seems to be a masochist constantly looking to put himself in harm's way in hopes of a tragic outcome. He even expresses disappointment when a battle is going favorably. Despite his desire to see himself harmed, he is noted to put up an honest fight. Though much to his delight, he often just ends up being squashed and left aside.
 Mr. Fish (voiced by Tony Acworth) - He's the underwater head honcho and has feelings for Ms. Duck, asking Skunk to make him a statue of her. He teaches Skunk the "Art of No Lung Fu" (underwater fighting) and carries a fishbowl whenever he needs to travel out of water.
 Blinky the Firefly – In "The Art of Responsibility", Blinky was Skunk's friend and his pet in the past, though the fireflies view it as Skunk being his pet. He cannot talk, like mature fireflies, so he communicates with a series of beeps, which Skunk used to his advantage in games. He helped end the Ninja Monkeys' night raids by lighting up the Valley as a defense. He made cameo appearances in later episodes.

Episodes

Production and broadcast
Skunk Fu! was produced by Cartoon Saloon and premiered in 28 May 2007 on ABC Australia. The series was broadcast in Ireland and the United Kingdom on 9 July 2007. Wu-Tang Clan member Ghostface Killah performed the theme song.

The series was shown on ABC Rollercoaster in Australia and BBC and S4C in the UK (under the Welsh title, Drewgi). TG4 broadcast Skunk Fu! in Irish. The series made its debut in the United States on the Kids' WB! block on The CW on 22 September 2007, and had reruns on Cartoon Network. The series aired on YTV in Canada and ANN in Japan.

A feature film based on the series was planned, but was quietly cancelled.

Home media
In region one from 23 November 2008 to 12 May 2009, NCircle Entertainment have released only three DVD volumes for the series, totaling eighteen segment-episodes.

See also

 Cartoon Saloon

References

External links
 
 Cartoon Saloon
 Skunk Fu Blog

2000s British children's television series
2007 Irish television series debuts
2008 Irish television series endings
2000s British animated television series
2007 British television series debuts
2008 British television series endings
British children's animated action television series
British children's animated comedy television series
British children's animated fantasy television series
British flash animated television series
Irish children's animated action television series
Irish children's animated comedy television series
Irish children's animated fantasy television series
Irish flash animated television series
Anime-influenced Western animated television series
English-language television shows
BBC children's television shows
Martial arts television series
Animated television series about mammals
Television series about pandas
Television series set in ancient China